The men's snooker singles tournament at the 1998 Asian Games in Thailand took place from 6 December to 8 December at Land Sports Complex.

Schedule
All times are Indochina Time (UTC+07:00)

Results

Finals

Top half

Section 1

Section 2

Bottom half

Section 3

Section 4

References 
Results

Cue sports at the 1998 Asian Games